The year 1999 is the fifth year in the history of Fighting Network Rings, a mixed martial arts promotion based in Japan. In 1999 Fighting Network Rings held 12 events beginning with, Rings Holland: Judgement Day.

Title fights

Events list

Rings Holland: Judgement Day

Rings Holland: Judgement Day was an event held on February 7, 1999, at The Sport Hall Zuid in Amsterdam, North Holland, Netherlands.

Results

Rings: Final Capture

Rings: Final Capture was an event held on February 21, 1999, in Japan.

Results

Rings Australia: NR 3

Rings Australia: NR 3 was an event held on March 7, 1999, at The Alexandra Hills Hotel in Australia.

Results

Rings: Rise 1st

Rings: Rise 1st was an event held on March 20, 1999, in Japan.

Results

Rings: Rise 2nd

Rings: Rise 2nd was an event held on April 23, 1999, in Japan.

Results

Rings: Rise 3rd

Rings: Rise 3rd was an event held on May 22, 1999, in Japan.

Results

Rings Holland: The Kings of the Magic Ring

Rings Holland: The Kings of the Magic Ring was an event held on June 20, 1999, at The Vechtsebanen Sport Hall in Utrecht, Netherlands.

Results

Rings: Rise 4th

Rings: Rise 4th was an event held on June 24, 1999, in Japan.

Results

Rings: Rise 5th

Rings: Rise 5th was an event held on August 19, 1999, in Japan.

Results

Rings: Rings Georgia

Rings: Rings Georgia was an event held on October 8, 1999, in Georgia.

Results

Rings: King of Kings 1999 Block A

Rings: King of Kings 1999 Block A was an event held on October 28, 1999, at The Yoyogi National Stadium Gym 2 in Tokyo, Japan.

Results

Rings: King of Kings 1999 Block B

Rings: King of Kings 1999 Block B was an event held on December 22, 1999, at The Osaka Prefectural Gymnasium in Osaka, Japan.

Results

See also 
 Fighting Network Rings
 List of Fighting Network Rings events

References

Fighting Network Rings events
1999 in mixed martial arts